The following are the scheduled events of association football (soccer) for the calendar year 2023 throughout the world. This includes the following:
 In countries whose league seasons fall within a single calendar year, the 2023 season.
 In countries which crown one champion in a season that spans two calendar years, the 2022–23 season.
 In countries which split their league season into two championships, a system often known in Latin America as Apertura and Clausura, all championships awarded in calendar 2023.

Events

Men's national teams

FIFA
 20 May – 11 June: 2023 FIFA U-20 World Cup in 
 10 November – 2 December: 2023 FIFA U-17 World Cup in 
 November – December: 2023 FIFA Beach Soccer World Cup in

AFC
 1–18 March: 2023 AFC U-20 Asian Cup in 
 : 
 : 
 16–26 March: 2023 AFC Beach Soccer Asian Cup in 
 15 June–2 July  2023 AFC U-17 Asian Cup in

AFF
 20 December 2022 – 16 January 2023: 2022 AFF Championship
 : 
 :

SAFF
 7–17 July: 2023 SAFF U-19 Championship in 
 1–11 September: 2023 SAFF U-17 Championship in

WAFF
 6–19 January: 25th Arabian Gulf Cup in 
 : 
 : 
 20 March – 2 April: 2023 WAFF Championship in

CAF
 13 January – 4 February: 2022 African Nations Championship in 
 : 
 : 
 : 
 4th: 
 19 February – 11 March: 2023 Africa U-20 Cup of Nations in 
 : 
 : 
 : 
 4th: 
 29 April – 19 May: 2023 Africa U-17 Cup of Nations in 
 June: 2023 Africa U-23 Cup of Nations in

CONCACAF
 11–26 February: 2023 CONCACAF U-17 Championship in 
 : 
 : 
 June: 2023 CONCACAF Nations League Finals
 24 June – 16 July: 2023 CONCACAF Gold Cup in

CONMEBOL
 19 January – 12 February: 2023 South American U-20 Championship in 
 : 
 : 
 : 
 4th: 
 30 March – 20 April: 2023 South American U-17 Championship in

OFC
 11–28 January: 2023 OFC U-17 Championship in 
 : 
 : 
 : 
 4th: 
 20–24 June: 2023 OFC Beach Soccer Nations Cup in 
 27 August – 9 September: 2023 OFC Men's Olympic Qualifying Tournament in 
 1–7 October: 2023 OFC Futsal Nations Cup in 
 19 November – 22 December: Football at the 2023 Pacific Games – Men's tournament in

UEFA
 12 May – 4 June: 2023 UEFA European Under-17 Championship in 
 14–18 June: 2023 UEFA Nations League Finals in 
 3–16 July: 2023 UEFA European Under-19 Championship in

Women's national teams

FIFA
 6 April: 2023 Women's Finalissima in 

AFC
 4–10 January: 2022 WAFF U-16 Girls Championship in 
 : 
 : 
 : 
 4th: 
 27–31 January: 2023 CAFA Women's Futsal Championship in 
 : 
 : 
 : 
 4th: 
 3–9 February: 2023 SAFF U-20 Women's Championship in 
 : 
 : 
 : 
 4th: 
 12–16 March: 2023 CAFA U-17 Women's Championship in 
 : 
 : 
 : 
 4th: 
 20–31 March: 2023 SAFF U-17 Women's Championship in

CAF
 20–29 January: 2023 WAFU Zone A Women's Cup in 
 : 
 : 
 : 
 4th: 
14–18 March: 2023 UNAF U-20 Women's Tournament in 
 : 
 : 
 : 
 4th:

OFC
 21 June – 8 July: 2023 OFC U-19 Women's Championship in 
 13–30 September: 2023 OFC U-16 Women's Championship in 
 19 November – 22 December: Football at the 2023 Pacific Games – Women's tournament in

UEFA
 17–19 March: UEFA Women's Futsal Euro 2023 in 
 : 
 : 
 : 
 4th: 
 14–26 May: 2023 UEFA Women's Under-17 Championship in 
 18–30 July: 2023 UEFA Women's Under-19 Championship in

International women's tournaments
 11–19 January: 2023 SAFF Women's Friendly Tournament in 
 : 
 : 
 : 
 4th: 
 15–21 February: 2023 Turkish Women's Cup in 
 :  and 
 :  and 
 15–21 February: 2023 Women's Revelations Cup in 
 : 
 : 
 : 
 4th: 
 15–21 February: 2023 Pinatar Cup in 
 : 
 : 
 : 
 4th: 
 15–21 February: 2023 Tournoi de France in 
 : 
 : 
 : 
 4th: 
 16–22 February: 2023 Arnold Clark Cup in 
 : 
 : 
 : 
 4th: 
 16–22 February: 2023 Cup of Nations in 
 : 
 : 
 : 
 4th: 
 16–22 February: 2023 Cyprus Women's Cup in 
 : 
 : 
 : 
 4th: 
 16–22 February: 2023 SheBelieves Cup in 
 : 
 : 
 : 
 4th:

Club continental champions

Men

Women

National leagues

UEFA

AFC

CAF

CONCACAF

CONMEBOL

OFC

Domestic cups

UEFA

AFC

CAF

CONCACAF

CONMEBOL

OFC

Women's leagues

UEFA

AFC

CONCACAF

CONMEBOL

CAF

OFC

CAF

CONCACAF

CONMEBOL

OFC

Women's domestic cups

UEFA

AFC

CAF

CONCACAF

CONMEBOL

OFC

Second, third, fourth, and fifth leagues

UEFA

AFC

CAF

CONCACAF

CONMEBOL

OFC

Domestic cups (Second, third, fourth, and fifth leagues)

AFC

CONMEBOL

UEFA

Women's second, third, fourth, and fifth leagues

UEFA

AFC

CAF

CONCACAF

CONMEBOL

OFC

Domestic cups (Women's second, third, fourth, and fifth leagues)

CONMEBOL

Youth leagues

UEFA

AFC

CAF

CONCACAF

CONMEBOL

OFC

Deaths

January
 1 January – Frank McGarvey, 66, Scottish footballer (Celtic, St Mirren)
 5 January – Ernesto Castano, 83, Italian footballer (Juventus)
 6 January – Gianluca Vialli, 58, Italian football player (Cremonese, Sampdoria, Juventus, Chelsea) and manager (Chelsea, Watford)
 7 January – Modeste M'bami, 40, Cameroonian footballer (Paris Saint-Germain, Marseille)
 8 January - Roberto Dinamite, 68, Brazilian footballer (Vasco da Gama)
 9 January - Rainer Ulrich, 73, German football player (Karlsruher SC) and manager (Karlsruher SC, VfR Mannheim, Bayern Munich II)
 10 January - Gaudenzio Bernasconi, 90, Italian footballer (Sampdoria)
 19 January - Anton Walkes, 25, English footballer (Atlanta United,PortsmouthCharlotte FC)
 23 January - Patrizio Billio, 48, Italian footballer (Crystal Palace, Dundee)

February
 1 February - Benny Dollo, Indonesian football coach
 6 February - Christian Atsu, Ghanaian footballer
 7 February - Ahmet Eyüp Türkaslan, Turkish footballer

March
 1 March - Just Fontaine, French footballer

References

External links

 
Association football by year